Dieter Kersten (born 25 October 1996) is a Belgian athlete who specializes in long distance and cross-country running.

Career
Kersten took part in the 2015 European Athletics Junior Championships in the 10,000 m, winning the bronze medal. In 2016, he became Belgian indoor champion in the 3000 m for the first time. In cross-country running, Kersten finished eighth in 2015 at the European U20 Cross Country Championships. The following year, he finished tenth in the U23 and won silver in the country classification with the Belgian team.

In April 2021, Kersten ran the Enschede Marathon in 2:10.22 on his marathon debut, making him eligible to participate in the 2020 Summer Olympics.

References

External links
 
 
 
 

1996 births
Living people
Belgian male long-distance runners
Belgian male marathon runners
Olympic athletes of Belgium
Athletes (track and field) at the 2020 Summer Olympics
People from Tongeren
Sportspeople from Limburg (Belgium)